Roland Karl Oscar Ericsson Paulsen (born 17 December 1981) is a Swedish author and sociologist. His thesis Empty Labor: Idleness And Workplace Resistance is about people who devote more than half of their work time to private activities, so-called "empty work". The dissertation was published at Cambridge University Press and received international attention from among others The Atlantic, The Economist and The Wall Street Journal.

Biography 
Paulsen was born in Hägersten, Stockholm on 17 December 1981. He received his Ph.D from Uppsala universitet and is a docent in sociology; he is now active at the institution of business administration at Lund university. He researches individuals relationship to waged work, and especially questions regarding why waged work takes up such a major role in peoples lives.

Research and engagement in public debate 
Paulsen claims that the people who have the highest income generally contributes the least. His dissertation Empty labor is about people who spend more than half of their time at work doing private activities. Roland Paulsen writes columns for Dagens Nyheter, Sweden's biggest newspaper. In these he has among other things explained his view on inequality and his critique of the theories of Hans Rosling. He has also co-authored Return to Meaning: A Social Science with Something to say (with Mats Alvesson) in which the authors address how the "publish or perish" game produces meaningless social science research that cannot address social problems and just serve to further academic tenure and promotion. Paulsen has also put forward the concept of functional stupidity [which according to paulsen is defined as] "[...] the modus operandi of ego-dystonic compliance we enter in order to endure long hours of imposed work assignments we would rather not perform.".

Criticism of the work-society 
In 2010 Paulsen published his book Arbetssamhället – Hur arbetet överlevde teknologin (Roughly translated: The work society - how work survived the technology.) which was critical of work.

Paulsen said that he wanted to achieve a change in how we perceive work, in relationship to that the need for work itself has decreased due to the technological development.

Paulsens considers it to be a waste of resources that peoples working hours hasn't decreased as technology has moved forward. As well as claimed that work is increasingly losing its ability to create value. Instead, Paulsen claims, that work takes on a religious function in contemporary society, and acts like a mechanism of distributing resources.

When asked why he thinks it is an important question for people who vote in political elections to create more work. Paulsen responded:

Bibliography 
Arbetssamhället - Hur arbetet överlevde teknologin (Gleerups, 2010)
Empty labor: Subjectivity and idleness at work (Uppsala universitet, cop. 2013)
Empty Labor: Idleness and Workplace Resistance (Cambridge University Press, 2014)
We merely obey: A story about the public employment service (Vi bara lyder: En berättelse om Arbetsförmedlingen) (Atlas, 2015)
Return to Meaning: A Social Science with Something to Say (Oxford University Press, 2017) (with Mats Alvesson and Yiannis Gabriel)
Re-think: a study of anxiety (Tänk om : en studie i oro) (Albert Bonniers Förlag, 2020)

Awards 
 27th International Labor Process Conference Award for best doctoral paper (2009)
 Winner of The Nordic Sociological Association Competition for Junior Sociologists (2010)
 Wallanderstipendiet from Jan Wallanders & Tom Hedelius foundation (2014)
 Johan Hansson-priset (2015)
 Natur & Kultur's debate-book price (2015)
 European Group for Organizational Studies (EGOS) book award (2017 Jun 17) 
 The documentary Vi bara lyder (We merely obey) which is based on Paulsens work won the International Documentary Film Festival Amsterdam's price for best short documentary in 2017.

References

External links 
Paulsens personal website - Rolandpaulsen.org
Roland Paulsens international staff-page at the Department of Business Administration - Lund university
Roland Paulsens staff-page at the sociological institution  - Uppsala university - archived from the original

1981 births
Living people
Swedish columnists
Swedish male writers
Swedish sociologists
Critics of work and the work ethic
Uppsala University alumni
Academic staff of Lund University